Dilawalpur is a village in Tarn Taran district, Punjab, India.

Villages in Tarn Taran district